The Kirby video game series is a franchise of platform games and other genres (including puzzle and racing games) published and produced by Nintendo. The games have been developed by Japan-based HAL Laboratory, a Nintendo second-party developer. All Kirby video games have been developed exclusively for Nintendo video game consoles and handhelds dating from the Nintendo Entertainment System to the current generation of video game consoles.

The series revolves around Kirby, the series' protagonist, and his adventures in the fictional world of Pop Star. A common gameplay element is Kirby's ability to copy enemy skills, allowing him to use them to progress through levels. This and other changes in gameplay from traditional platform games distinguish the series from other entries in the genre. Currently, the series contains twenty games. A one-hundred episode anime series based on the video games, Kirby: Right Back at Ya!, was created in Japan and formerly distributed by 4Kids TV in North America. A special 101st episode was created for the now retired Nintendo Video service, and was not in the anime style of the original 100 episodes. The Kirby series is among the best-selling video game franchises with over twenty million games sold worldwide. The franchise was conceived by Masahiro Sakurai as a game series for beginners, for which he partially attributes the series' success.

Video games

Platform games

Traditional

Non-traditional

Remakes

Traditional

Non-traditional
{{Video game titles|
{{Video game titles/item
| article= Kirby's Epic Yarn#Nintendo 3DS version
| title= Kirby's Extra Epic Yarn
| date= 
| canceled=
| refs=
| release=2019 – Nintendo 3DS
| notes= *Remake of Kirby's Epic Yarn.
Known in Japan as 
}}
}}

Spin-offsKirby Battle Royale (Known in Japan as ) - Released in 2017 on Nintendo 3DS.Kirby Fighters Deluxe - Released in 2014 for the Nintendo 3DS eShop. It is a more complete version of the minigame Kirby Fighters from Kirby: Triple Deluxe.Dedede's Drum Dash Deluxe - Released in 2014 for the Nintendo 3DS eShop. It is a more complete version of the minigame Dedede's Drum Dash from Kirby: Triple Deluxe.Team Kirby Clash Deluxe - Released in 2017 for the Nintendo 3DS eShop. It is a free to play game. It is a more complete version of the minigame Team Kirby Clash from Kirby: Planet Robobot.Kirby's Blowout Blast - Released in 2017 for the Nintendo 3DS eShop. It is a more complete version of the minigame Kirby 3D Rumble from Kirby: Planet Robobot.Super Kirby Clash - Released in 2019 as a free to play game on the Nintendo Switch. It plays like Team Kirby Clash Deluxe, but has a different story, different bosses and many other notable changes.Kirby Fighters 2 - Released in 2020 on the Nintendo Switch. It is a sequel to Kirby Fighters Deluxe, but with new playable characters, new stages, and new challenge modes.

Canceled titlesKid Kirby - Super Nintendo Entertainment System - Canceled
 - Game Boy Color - CanceledKirby GCN'' ( in Japan) - GameCube - Canceled

Other media

Notes

References

External links
Official US Kirby website
Official Japanese Kirby website 
HAL Laboratory website 
Nintendo website

Media
Media lists by video games franchise
Mass media by franchise
Nintendo-related lists